Moving Pictures may refer to:

Film, television and theatre
 Moving picture or film, a story conveyed with moving images
 Moving Pictures (TV series), a 1990s UK programme devoted to film
 Moving Pictures (originally Glasshouses), a 1981 play by Stephen Lowe
 Moving Pictures, a 1999 play by Sharon Pollock

Literature 
 Moving Pictures (magazine), an American film and film industry periodical
 Moving Pictures (novel), a 1990 Discworld novel by Terry Pratchett
 Moving Pictures  (webcomic), a late 2000s webcomic by Kathryn and Stuart Immonen
 Moving Pictures, an autobiography by Ali MacGraw

Music 
 Moving Pictures (band), an Australian rock group
 Moving Pictures (Rush album), 1981
 Moving Pictures (Holger Czukay album), 1993
Moving Pictures (Ravi Coltrane album), 1998
 "Moving Pictures" (The Kinks song), a 1979 song
 "Moving Pictures" (The Cribs song), a 2007 song
 "Moving Pictures", a 2002 song by Fall Out Boy from Fall Out Boy's Evening Out with Your Girlfriend

See also
 
 Film (disambiguation)
 Movie (disambiguation)